The Ministry of Chemicals and Fertilizers in India is the federal ministry with administrative purview over three departments namely:
Department of Chemicals and Petrochemicals
Department of Fertilizers.     
Department of Pharmaceuticals.

The ministry is headed by the Minister of Chemicals and fertilizers. Mansukh L. Mandaviya is the current minister for the departments.

Department of Chemicals and Fertilizers
The Department of Chemicals and Petrochemicals was under the Ministry of Industry until December 1989, when it was brought under the Ministry of Petroleum and Chemicals. On June 5, 1991, the Department of Chemicals and Petrochemicals was transferred to the Ministry of Chemicals and Fertilisers.

The department is entrusted with the responsibility of planning, development and regulations of the chemicals, petrochemicals and pharmaceutical industry sector, inducting:
Drugs and pharmaceuticals, excluding those specifically allotted to other departments
Insecticides, excluding the administration of the Insecticides Act, 1968 (46 of 1968).
Molasses
Alcohol – Industrial and Potable from the molasses route.
Dyestuffs and dye intermediates
All organic and inorganic chemicals not specifically allotted to any other ministry or department.
Bhopal disaster – special laws
Petrochemicals
Industries relating to production of non-cellulosic synthetic fibres such as nylon, polyester, and acrylic
Synthetic rubber
Plastics including fabrications of plastic and moulded goods
Planning, development and control of, and assistance to, all industries dealt with by the Department

The department has various divisions under it. The important being:
Chemical Division
Petrochemicals Division
Monitoring and Evaluation Division (M&E Division)

Department of Pharmaceuticals

Bulk Drug Parks

Medical Devices Parks

Pradhan Mantri Bharatiya Janaushadhi Pariyojana 

Pradhan Mantri Bharatiya Janaushadhi Pariyojana (PMBJP) is a campaign launched by the Department of Pharmaceuticals, Government of India, to provide quality medicines at affordable prices to the masses through special kendras known as Pradhan Mantri Bharatiya Janaushadhi Pariyojana Kendra. Pradhan Mantri Bharatiya Janaushadhi Pariyojana Kendra (PMBJPK) have been set up to provide generic drugs, which are available at lesser prices but are equivalent in quality and efficacy as expensive branded drugs. BPPI (Bureau of Pharma Public Sector Undertakings of India) has been established under the Department of Pharmaceuticals, Govt. of India, with the support of all the CPSUs for co-ordinating procurement, supply and marketing of generic drugs through Pradhan Mantri Bharatiya Janaushadhi Pariyojana Kendra.

Attached offices 

 National Pharmaceutical Pricing Authority (NPPA)

NPPA is an organisation of the Government of India which was established, inter alia, to fix/ revise the prices of controlled bulk drugs and formulations and to enforce prices and availability of the medicines in the country, under the Drugs (Prices Control) Order, 1995.

The organisation is also entrusted with the task of recovering amounts overcharged by manufacturers for the controlled drugs from the consumers.

It also monitors the prices of decontrolled drugs in order to keep them at reasonable levels.

Autonomous bodies 

Central Institute of Plastics Engineering and Technology (CIPET) 

Central Institute of Plastics Engineering & Technology (CIPET) is a premier National Institution devoted to Academic, Technology Support & Research (ATR) for the Plastics & allied industries, in India. First CIPET campus was established by Government of India in 1968 at Chennai and subsequently 14 CIPET Campuses have been established by Government of India in the country.

Today CIPET has many Campus's
Central Institute of Plastics Engineering & Technology, Ahmedabad 
Central Institute of Plastics Engineering & Technology, Amritsar 
Central Institute of Plastics Engineering & Technology, Aurangabad 
Central Institute of Plastics Engineering & Technology, Bhopal 
Central Institute of Plastics Engineering & Technology, Bhubaneswar
Central Institute of Plastics Engineering & Technology, Chennai 
Central Institute of Plastics Engineering & Technology, Guwahati 
Central Institute of Plastics Engineering & Technology, Hyderabad 
Central Institute of Plastics Engineering & Technology, Hajipur 
Central Institute of Plastics Engineering & Technology, Haldia 
Central Institute of Plastics Engineering & Technology, Jaipur 
Central Institute of Plastics Engineering & Technology, Imphal 
Central Institute of Plastics Engineering & Technology, Lucknow 
Central Institute of Plastics Engineering & Technology, Mysore  
Central Institute of Plastics Engineering & Technology, Khunti
Central Institute of Plastics Engineering & Technology, Panipat
Central Institute of Plastics Engineering & Technology, Madurai
Central Institute of Plastics Engineering & Technology, Raipur
These are contributing through ATR services to the industries in India and Abroad, having uniform infrastructural facilities in the areas of Design, CAD/CAM/CAE, Tooling & Mould Manufacturing, Plastics processing, Testing and Quality control.

CIPET chennai also started a department called ARSTPS (Advance Research School for Technology and Product Simulation) which provides facilities in areas of Design, CAD/CAM/CAE. It also provide a ME degree program for CAD/CAM.A

Central Public Sector Undertakings
Bengal Chemicals and Pharmaceuticals Limited (BCPL)
Bramhaputra Valley Fertilizer Corporation Limited (BVFCL)
FCI Aravali Gypsum and Minerals India Limited (FAGMIL)
Fertilizers and Chemicals Travancore Limited (FACT)
Fertilizer Association of India (FAI)
Fertilizer Corporation of India (FCIL)
Hindustan Antibiotics Limited (HAL)
Hindustan Insecticides Limited (HIL)
Hindustan Organic Chemicals Limited (HOCL)
Madras Fertilizers Limited (MFL)
National Fertilizers Limited (NFL)
Projects and Development India Limited (PDIL)
Rashtriya Chemicals and Fertilizers Limited (RCF)
Bramhaputra Cracker and Polymer Limited (BCPL)
Karnataka Antibiotics & Pharmaceuticals Ltd

List of  Ministers

Ministers of State

References 

 
Chemicals and Fertilisers